In mathematics complex analysis, the Sarason interpolation theorem, introduced by , is a generalization of the Caratheodory interpolation theorem and Nevanlinna–Pick interpolation.

References

Theorems in analysis
Interpolation